Japanese Marines may refer to:

Before and during World War II
Some forces under the aegis of the Imperial Japanese Navy Land Forces, including:
 Special Naval Landing Forces (SNLF), naval infantry
 Japanese marine paratroopers of World War II, SNLF Paratroopers
 Kaiheidan ("Marine Corps"), non-combat training units
 Amphibious Brigades (Imperial Japanese Army), Japanese Army units formed in 1943

21st century
 Western Army Infantry Regiment, amphibious force of the Japan Ground Self-Defense Force, 2002–2018
 The Amphibious Rapid Deployment Brigade, the amphibious force of the Japan Ground Self-Defense Force from 2018